HMAS Teal (M 1152) (formerly HMS Jackton) was a  operated by the Royal Navy (RN) and the Royal Australian Navy (RAN).

Construction
The vessel was built by Philip and Son, Dartmouth and launched on 28 February 1955, and commissioned into the Royal Navy as HMS Jackton.

Operational history

Australia
The ship was purchased by the RAN in 1961, and was commissioned as HMAS Teal on 30 August 1962.

During the mid-1960s, Teal was one of several ships operating in support of the Malaysian government during the Indonesia-Malaysia Confrontation. On 13 December 1964 HMAS Teal intercepted two Indonesian sampans off Raffles Light in the south western corner of the Singapore Strait. One sampan opened fire when illuminated by Teal's Signal Lamp. Teal retaliated, killing three of the sampan's crew and the remainder of the enemy surrendered. One was an officer of the Indonesian Navy and the sampan was found to be carrying a quantity of explosives, weapons and other military equipment. This service was later recognised with the battle honour "Malaysia 1964–66".

Decommissioning and fate
HMAS Teal paid off on 14 August 1970. Teal was sold to Ian and Gary Baker, Tasmania. The vessel was transported to Tasmania where she was later sold. 

In 1994 Teal became a research and training ship for the maritime faculties of Near East University and the University of Kyrenia, in Northern Cyprus. On 11 September 2022, the ship was given a new berth in the port of Kyrenia, to become a maritime museum.

References

Bibliography

Ton-class minesweepers of the Royal Navy
Ships built in Dartmouth
1955 ships
Cold War minesweepers of the United Kingdom
Ton-class minesweepers of the Royal Australian Navy
Cold War minesweepers of Australia
Museum ships
training ships
Ships of Cyprus